William Jess Knox (born 9 September 1937) is a Scottish former football player and manager, who played as a wing half. As a player, he appeared in the Scottish Football League for Raith Rovers and Forfar Athletic and in  the Football League for Barrow. He went on to have a successful managerial career in Scottish junior football with Auchinleck Talbot, winning the Scottish Junior Cup five times, including three consecutive wins.

Playing career
Willie Knox was born in Kilmarnock, Ayrshire, on 9 September 1937. He played in local junior football with Annbank United before beginning his senior career with Raith Rovers in 1955. He was with Raith for three years, making 13 league appearances in the top division of the Scottish Football League and playing alongside a young Jim Baxter. He was signed for Third Lanark in 1958 by manager Bob Shankly, but made no league appearances for them. He briefly played in England, joining Barrow in 1959 and playing a single Football League match, before returning to Scottish football with Forfar Athletic, his last senior club. He left Forfar in 1963 after making 91 league appearances and scoring 4 goals, returning to junior football in his native Ayrshire with Irvine Victoria.

Managerial career
Knox was manager of Auchinleck Talbot between 1977 and 1993, during which time they won 43 trophies, including the Scottish Junior Cup five times in the space of seven seasons. In the 1986 final against Pollok, Knox demonstrated his apparent lack of concern at going 2–0 down early on by calmly eating an egg sandwich on the touchline; Auchinleck went on to win the match 3–2. They retained the trophy against Kilbirnie Ladeside in 1987 and then defeated Petershill in the 1988 final, becoming the first club to win the trophy in three consecutive seasons. Under Knox, Auchinleck also won consecutive Junior Cups in 1991 and 1992, against Newtongrange Star and Glenafton Athletic respectively. They also won the West of Scotland Junior Cup and the Ayrshire Junior Football League nine times each during this era.

After leaving Auchinleck, Knox managed their local rivals Cumnock Juniors, but didn't repeat his earlier success, with the team being relegated. He also had a spell managing the Scotland Junior international team, but left after one match due to disagreeing with the team selection process. He ended his managerial career with a few months at Irvine Meadow.

Personal life
Knox lived in retirement in his home town of Kilmarnock along with Sheila, his wife for over forty years. During this time he also helped to run a local youth team, Balmoral Boys Club.

References

External links

1937 births
Footballers from Kilmarnock
Scottish footballers
Association football wing halves
Scottish Football League players
English Football League players
Scottish Junior Football Association players
Scottish football managers
Scottish Junior Football Association managers
Annbank United F.C. players
Raith Rovers F.C. players
Third Lanark A.C. players
Barrow A.F.C. players
Forfar Athletic F.C. players
Irvine Victoria F.C. players
Auchinleck Talbot F.C. managers
Cumnock Juniors F.C. managers
Irvine Meadow XI F.C. managers
Living people